Desertoplusia is a genus of moths of the family Noctuidae.

Species
 Desertoplusia bella Christoph, 1887
 Desertoplusia colornata Varga & Ronkay, 1991
 Desertoplusia paghmana Wiltshire, 1971

References
 Desertoplusia at Markku Savela's Lepidoptera and Some Other Life Forms
 Natural History Museum Lepidoptera genus database

Plusiinae